Eudibamus is an extinct genus of biped bolosaurid ankyramorph parareptile known from the Free State of Thuringia of central Germany. It had a very small size reaching only 25-26 cm in length.

Discovery
Eudibamus is known only from the holotype MNG 8852, an articulated and almost complete cranial and postcranial skeleton. It was collected from the uppermost part of the Tambach Formation, dating to the Artinskian stage of the Late Cisuralian Series (or alternatively upper Rotliegend), about 284–279.5 million years ago. It was found in the lowermost formational unit of the Upper Rotliegend Group or Series of the Bromacker Quarry, the middle part of the Thuringian Forest, near the village of Tambach-Dietharz. Eudibamus is claimed to be the first bipedal vertebrate.

Etymology
Eudibamus was first named by David S. Berman, Robert R. Reisz, Diane Scott, Amy C. Henrici, Stuart S. Sumida and Thomas Martens in 2000 and the type species is Eudibamus cursoris. The generic name means 'typical two-footed', from Greek eu-di-bāmos, based on bainō ‘to go’).   The specific name is derived from the Latin word 'cursor', for 'runner'.

References

Procolophonomorphs
Prehistoric reptile genera
Permian reptiles of Europe
Fossil taxa described in 2000